Lucian Strâmbeanu (4 February 1947 - 7 May 1988) was a Romanian footballer who played as a midfielder. He was part of "U" Craiova's team that won the 1973–74 Divizia A, which was the first trophy in the club's history.

Honours
Universitatea Craiova
Divizia A: 1973–74
Cupa României runner-up: 1974–75

References

External links
Lucian Strâmbeanu at Labtof.ro

1946 births
1988 deaths
Romanian footballers
Association football midfielders
Liga I players
Liga II players
CS Universitatea Craiova players
Footballers from Bucharest